The 2018 Port Orchard tornado was a rare strong tornado that struck the city of Port Orchard, Washington on December 18, 2018. The National Weather Service office in Seattle rated the tornado EF2 following an on-site survey of the storm damage the day after the event. There were no fatalities or major injuries reported. This was the first tornado to have touched down in Western Washington since an EF0 tornado in 2017 near Monroe. Damage was most pronounced near the South Kitsap Regional Park.

The tornado was the largest recorded in Kitsap County, and the 12th recorded F2/EF2 tornado to touch down in Washington since 1950. Washington state averages 2.5 tornadoes annually, but only 0.1 tornadoes in the month of December; the majority of these are rated EF0.

Meteorological synopsis
The tornado was part of an atmospheric river event pointed straight at the Pacific Northwest causing $18 million (2018 USD) of damage between December 10 and December 25. This system caused flooding, severe erosion, and widespread power outages. Washington Governor Jay Inslee sought funding from the Federal Emergency Management Agency for damages caused during the prolonged stormy period, including for the Port Orchard tornado.

There was not a tornado warning issued for the storm that produced the tornado. The Storm Prediction Center placed the Kitsap Peninsula and nearby Olympic Peninsula under a risk for general thunderstorms for the day, but did not note a chance of severe thunderstorms for the region.

The storm was a product of the Olympic Mountain velocity shear zone, a meteorological phenomenon that occurs when an incoming onshore flow in usually in the wake of a cold front from the Pacific Ocean is forced around the Olympic Mountains and adds the needed low-level wind shear that can enhance rotating storms moving through the area. Velocity scans show that this storm had mesoscale rotation to about 10,000 and rotation could be seen by the Langley Radar on Camano Island Doppler weather radar imagery.

Damage and response
Most of the damage from the tornado occurred near Salmonberry and Bethel Roads to the north of SR 160. There were approximately 250 homes damaged during the storm, including a few that had their roofs partially or completely ripped off. This number was lowered from earlier estimates of around 450 structures. Many large trees were snapped and uprooted, and several homes were also severely damaged when trees fell into them. Some of the most intense damage was inflicted to a dry storage facility, which sustained roof loss and collapse of numerous walls. A strip mall sustained considerable damage as well. About twenty homes were initially evacuated because of fears of a gas leak.

Several roads were closed after the event, both because of debris on the roads and to limit access to damaged neighborhoods. Shelters were also opened to help victims affected by the storm.

See also
List of North American tornadoes and tornado outbreaks
List of United States tornadoes from November to December 2018

References

History of Kitsap County, Washington
Tornadoes in Washington (state)
Tornadoes of 2018
2018 in Washington (state)
F2 tornadoes